The Rural Municipality of Wawken No. 93 is a rural municipality (RM) in the Canadian province of Saskatchewan within Census Division No. 1 and  Division No. 1. It is located in the southeast portion of the province.

History 
The RM of Wawken No. 93 incorporated as a rural municipality on January 1, 1913. Although possessing a sound inventory similar to many Saskatchewan place names of indigenous Algonquian origin, the name Wawken is in fact a portmanteau of Wawota and Kennedy, the RM's two main urban communities.

Geography

Communities and localities 
The following urban municipalities are surrounded by the RM.

Towns
 Wawota

Villages
 Kennedy
 Kenosee Lake

The following unincorporated communities are within the RM.

Localities
 Dumas
 Vandura

Demographics 

Economy 
Agriculture plays an important role in the RM.

Attractions 
The RM includes Kenosee Lake (located with Moose Mountain Provincial Park) and the Kenosee Superslides. The RM also includes the ghost town of Cannington Lake.

Government 
The RM of Wawken No. 93 is governed by an elected municipal council and an appointed administrator that meets on the second Thursday of every month. The reeve of the RM is Dawn Cameron while its administrator is Katelyn Ethier. The RM's office is located in Wawota.

See also 
 List of rural municipalities in Saskatchewan
 List of communities in Saskatchewan

References 

Wawken

Division No. 1, Saskatchewan